The magistrate of Miaoli is the chief executive of the government of Miaoli County. This list includes directly elected magistrates of the county. The incumbent Magistrate is independent Chung Tung-chin since 25 December 2022.

Directly elected County Magistrates

Timeline

See also
 Miaoli County Government

References

External links 
 Magistrates - Miaoli County Government 

Miaoli